Monsignor James Nugent (3 March 1822 – 27 June 1905) was a Roman Catholic priest of the Archdiocese of Liverpool.  Because he was also a pioneer with his work in relation to child welfare, poverty relief and social reform, Nugent Care was founded upon his ideals.

Nugent was born on 3 March 1822 in Hunter Street, Liverpool. Nugent was educated in Ushaw College from 1838 to 1843 before he became a student at the English College in Rome. He was ordained to the Diaconate in 1845, and on 30 August a year later he was ordained to the Priesthood at St Nicholas's, Liverpool.

In 1849 he started a Ragged School in Spitalfields and on 7 January 1850 he opened a Middle School for Boys in Rodney Street along with Fr Worthy. In 1856 the Catholic Reformatory Association was established with Nugent as secretary. Nugent was named as the owner and editor of the Northern Press in 1859, and in 1860 he founded The Catholic Times and a number of other publications.

On 1 January 1860 Nugent was appointed the first Catholic chaplain to Walton Gaol.  Nugent and Bishop O'Reilly jointly founded the Liverpool Catholic Children's Protection Society on 16 April 1881. In 1891 Nugent opened a refuge for fallen women in Paul Street, Liverpool.

On 12 June 1892 Nugent was made domestic prelate with title of Monsignor by Pope Leo XIII. On 16 May 1905, whilst returning home from a trip aboard the RMS Oceanic, Nugent had a bad fall on the deck, sustaining a head injury and impairment of sight. Monsignor Nugent died on 27 June 1905 at age 83 at the Harewood House, Formby after contracting pneumonia.

References

1822 births
1905 deaths
Alumni of Ushaw College
19th-century English Roman Catholic priests
Clergy from Liverpool